Pirsig may refer to:
 Detlef Pirsig (1945–2019), a German football player
 Maynard Pirsig (1902–1997), an American legal scholar and academic
 Robert M. Pirsig (1928–2017), Maynard's son, an American writer and philosopher, author of Zen and the Art of Motorcycle Maintenance